Philippe Dunoyer (born 11 January 1968) is a French politician from Caledonia Together who has been Member of Parliament for New Caledonia's 1st constituency since 2017.

References 

Living people
1968 births
Members of the Congress of New Caledonia
Deputies of the 15th National Assembly of the French Fifth Republic
Deputies of the 16th National Assembly of the French Fifth Republic
Union of Democrats and Independents politicians
21st-century French politicians
Paul Cézanne University alumni
Members of Parliament for New Caledonia